L.T.D. is an American R&B/funk band best known for their 1977 hit single, "(Every Time I Turn Around) Back in Love Again" and "Holding On (When Love Is Gone)", as well as their many ballads, such as "Love Ballad", "We Both Deserve Each Other's Love", and "Where Did We Go Wrong?".

Career
L.T.D. (standing for Love, Togetherness, and Devotion), was formed in Greensboro, North Carolina as Love Men Limited, in 1968. They initially consisted of members Arthur "Lorenzo" Carnegie (alto, tenor saxes, flute, guitar), Jake Riley (trombone) Carle Wayne Vickers (trumpet, flute, soprano sax) and Abraham "Onion" Miller (tenor sax, vocals) who had been working as members of the 15 piece "Fantastic Soul Men Orchestra" backing the popular duo Sam & Dave, along with Jimmy "J.D." Davis (keyboards, vocals). They then relocated to New York City, where Toby Wynn (baritone sax) joined them. While performing on a gig in Providence, Rhode Island, Jeffrey Osborne (drums, lead vocals) was recruited by them.

After two years in New York, they relocated to Los Angeles, California, where Jeffrey's brother, Billy Osborne (organ, drums, keyboards, co-lead vocals), Celeste Cole (vocals), Henry E. Davis (bass, vocals) and Robert Santiel (congas, percussion) joined them. 1974 found them signing with A&M Records as L.T.D. (Love Togetherness & Devotion). In 1976, Johnny McGhee (guitar) joined the band. By this time Jeffrey Osborne became the group's primary lead vocalist, with Melvin Webb taking over on drums in 1977. Webb was replaced by Alvino Bennett in late 1978.

The group then went on to release songs such as "Love Ballad" (1976), "(Every Time I Turn Around) Back in Love Again" (1977), "Holding On (When Love Is Gone)", and many others. Soon after the band's 1980 album Shine On, Jeffrey and Billy Osborne departed to start solo careers. Andre Ray and Leslie Wilson (formerly of New Birth) were then chosen as lead vocalists for their next album Love Magic (1981) which produced two more hits, "April Love" and "Kicking Back". Leslie Wilson left to continue his solo career and L.T.D. stayed busy in the music industry by recording for small independent record labels, and doing their own personal music projects.

In 1999, a new lineup of L.T.D. featuring three original members — Carnegie, Vickers, and McGhee — along with new members Tre'sure (lead vocals, keys), Aya Iwata, (keys, vocals), Herbert Lee Woods (keys, vocals), Steve Toussaint (bass, vocals), and Tefere Hazy (drums, vocals) was formed and have been touring since the 2000s.

Melvin Webb died in 1982, Jake Riley died in 2000, and J.D. Davis died in 2008. Henry E. Davis died in 2012 in Los Angeles, CA.

Discography

Studio albums

Compilation albums
Classics, Vol. 27 (1987, A&M)
Greatest Hits (1996, A&M)
The Millennium Collection: The Best of L.T.D. (2000, A&M)

Singles

References

External links
L.T.D. official website

A&M Records artists
American funk musical groups
American soul musical groups
American dance music groups
African-American musical groups
Musical groups established in 1968